Rishiraj Singh (born 23 July 1961) is a retired Indian Police Service (I.P.S.) officer. He was Director General of Prisons and Correctional Services of the Kerala. He retired on July 31, 2021 as the Director General of Police (Prisons).

Career
He took charge as joint director CBI's ACB Central Zone, Bhopal in January 2013. He was posted to Thiruvananthapuram as the Transport Commissioner on June. Under his administration accident rates declined considerably. He later became Excise Commissioner, Kerala.

Singh was appointed to the IPS in 1985 and is a part of the Kerala cadre. He started his career as an ASP in Kerala and served as DCP in Kochi and Commissioner of Police in Thiruvananthapuram. He was appointed SP and later DIG in the Central Bureau of Investigation.

References

1961 births
Living people
Indian Police Service officers